The Epinomis  is a dialogue attributed to Plato.  Some sources in antiquity began attributing its authorship to Philip of Opus, and many modern scholars consider it spurious.  The dialogue continues the discussion undertaken in Plato's Laws.

The persons involved in the dialogue are the same as in Laws: Clinias of Crete, Megillus of Sparta, and an Athenian stranger.

Title

The title Epinomis designates the work as an appendix to Plato's Laws (whose title in Greek is Nomoi).  Our sources also make reference to it as the thirteenth book of the Laws (though this presupposes the division of that dialogue into twelve books, which "is probably not earlier than the Hellenistic age"), as well as under the titles Nocturnal Council (because it deals with the higher education of that Council, beyond what is described in Laws, in mathematics-based astronomy) and Philosopher (probably because the Nocturnal Council's members are "the counterpart of the guardians in the Republic who are said to be the true philosophers").

Synopsis 

Cleinias has returned together with the other participants from the discussion recounted in the Laws, and wants to know what type of knowledge predisposes man to wisdom (ποιεῖν πρὸς φρόνησιν). The Athenian begins his discussion by saying that the human race is neither blessed nor happy, for life is hard by design. No sooner do the toils of growing up and getting educated end, that old age begins (973d-974a). And yet, he will attempt to answer by first going through the list of existing sciences, like agriculture and medicine, to see if any could be called wisdom. The Athenian finds them all wanting, as they all have to do with opinions rather than truth (976a-b). He then moves to work by elimination, and see if there is a science that by removing it mankind is rendered thoughtless. Answering this question is much easier: the science of numbers (τὸν ἀριθμὸν δοῦσα), which is so important it must have been given by God (976e), however one might conceive of him (977b). Everything in nature moves through discrete phases, like the waxing and waning of the moon, and so, everything can be understood through numbers.

But as to actual wisdom rather than just knowledge, the Athenian has yet to make his case. And to proceeds, such is the importance of this task, he must first give praise to the gods while correcting the erroneous assumptions on their nature (980a-c). The most important thing to know is that the soul is older than the body, and is in control of the body, the two conditions being linked as the older is also more divine (θεοειδέστερον) than the younger (980e). He moves in to say that creation is made from various combinations of the five elements, adding aether to the four essentials: fire, earth, water and air. Animals and men are made mostly from earth, while other more heavenly creatures from the rest of the elements. Most people think of the stars as having no mind because their motion is repetitive (982d). This however is a mistake, as it's for this very reason that the stars are intelligent, enough to always travel in the same course (982e).  Considering their size, the stars are not what they appear but are actually immense, in a similar way that the sun appears small but is in fact larger than the earth (983a). The Athenian continues by enumerating the eight planets known to the Greeks. He continues by saying that while the Greeks got their knowledge of astronomy from other nations, only they turned it into real knowledge, thus honouring the gods better (987e). There is also hope that in the future, more knowledge will be acquired, and so mankind will approach the gods even more by understanding it.

And so, it is only through that knowledge, the real nature of the universe that mankind can achieve virtue, while even the worst will be somewhat restrained from their evil (989c).

Question of authenticity
The Epinomis forms part of the traditional canon of Plato's works (for example, it is included in the ninth and last of the Thrasyllan tetralogies).  Already in antiquity, however, Diogenes Laërtius and the sources used by the Suda attributed the work to Philip of Opus.  Unlike the other doubtful dialogues (but like those Epistles that are spurious), the Epinomis, if it is not the genuine work of Plato, is a literary forgery.

The authenticity of Epinomis has also been questioned on the grounds of its philosophical content.  Leonardo Tarán, while finding parallels for many of the allegedly un-Platonic elements of the dialogue's style, declared it spurious based on (in the words of a sympathetic reviewer) "the much firmer ground of the misunderstanding or contradiction of Platonic doctrines, such as the placing of astronomy above dialectic as the supreme object of study, the rejection of the Ideas, the introduction of a fifth element, aether, between fire and air, and the elaborate theory of daemons inhabiting the three middle elements."  Werner Jaeger detected the influence of Aristotle's On Philosophy (a lost work Jaeger believed to have been published shortly before Epinomis in 348/347 BC) on much of the Epinomis, including the idea of the "fifth body."

Gerard Ledger's stylometric analysis of Plato's works supports the authenticity of Epinomis, finding statistical similarities between this dialogue and Laws, Philebus, Sophist, and Timaeus (as well as the Seventh Letter).  Holger Thesleff, who suspected that Plato collaborated with younger associates in writing many of the works attributed to him, considered the closely related style of Laws and Epinomis to be a "secretary's style."

References

External links
 Epinomis in English: trans. W. R. M. Lamb
 Epinomis in Greek on Perseus
 Epinomis in Greek: ed. Friedrich Ast, 1814; in HTML
Epinomis translated by George Burges
Free public domain audiobook version of ''Epinomis translated by George Burges
 . Collection includes Epinomis. George Burges, translator (1855).

Dialogues of Plato